Shinrone GAA is a Gaelic Athletic Association club located in Shinrone, County Offaly, Ireland. The club is almost exclusively concerned with the game of hurling. The club participates in competitions organized by Offaly GAA.The club fields teams from u6 to senior grade

Achievements
 Offaly Senior Hurling Championship 2022
 Offaly Intermediate Hurling Championship Winners 1932, 1957, 1991, 2020
 Offaly Junior A Hurling Championship Winners 1919, 1924, 1951, 1968, 1976, 2003, 2009, 2012, 2018, 
 Offaly Minor A Hurling Championship (3) 1951, 1959, 2013
 Offaly Under-21 A Hurling Championship 1960-61, 1977 (St Mary’s) 1978, 2013, 2014, 2016
 Offaly Under-16 A Hurling Championship (4) 1936, 1954, 2008, 2017
 Community Games All Ireland Gold 2012
 Offaly Under-14 A Hurling Championship 1993, 2004, 2010, 2014, 2015
 Offaly Under-12 A Championship 2019
 Offaly Under-13 A Hurling Championship  2019 (St Mary’s)

Notable players
 Brendan Keeshan
 Seán O'Meara

References

Gaelic games clubs in County Offaly
Hurling clubs in County Offaly